Merwyn "Merv" Norrish  (28 October 1926 – 21 May 2021) was a New Zealand diplomat who served as New Zealand's ambassador to the European Community, acting high commissioner to London, ambassador to the United States, and secretary of Foreign Affairs.

Early life
Born in Ashburton, Norrish was educated at Ashburton High School and Christchurch Boys' High School, before graduating from Canterbury University College with a Bachelor of Arts in 1948  and a Master of Arts with first-class honours in history in 1949.

Professional career
Norrish joined the Department of External Affairs as a recruit in 1949, as one of the fledgling intake in Alister McIntosh’s new department. Norrish spent his early diplomatic career in Wellington and Paris, with a posting to Paris from 1955 to 1958.

In 1961, Norrish was posted to New York City as New Zealand's deputy permanent representative to the United Nations.

Norrish was appointed New Zealand's ambassador to the European Community, in Brussels, in 1967. In 1972, he became acting high commissioner to London, before returning to Wellington as deputy secretary of Foreign Affairs in 1973. During his time as deputy secretary, he was considered to be more closely aligned to the United States' foreign policy position than his secretary, Frank Corner.

In 1978, Norrish became New Zealand's ambassador to the United States in Washington, D.C., and Mexico.

In 1980, Norrish was appointed New Zealand secretary of Foreign Affairs, a post he held until his retirement in 1989. During that period, Norrish was the key foreign policy official during New Zealand's withdrawal from ANZUS and the nuclear ship controversy. Norrish is understood to have warned Prime Minister David Lange not to antagonise British Prime Minister Margaret Thatcher by participating in the Oxford Union debate, and was responsible for implementing New Zealand's nuclear-free policy against his personal instincts. During his tenure, French secret agents bombed the Greenpeace ship Rainbow Warrior in 1985.

Later life and death
In retirement, Norrish served as chairman of New Zealand On Air, and the France-New Zealand Friendship Fund. He died on 21 May 2021.

Honours
In the 2002 Queen's Birthday and Golden Jubilee Honours, Norrish was appointed a Companion of the New Zealand Order of Merit, for public services.

Personal life
In 1949 he married Francoise Honoré, a Frenchwoman whom he had met at university. For leisure, he enjoyed playing croquet and Scrabble.

Notes

References

An eye, an ear and a voice: 50 years in New Zealand’s external relations edited by Malcolm Templeton (1993, Ministry of Foreign Affairs and Trade, Wellington NZ) 

1926 births
2021 deaths
Ambassadors of New Zealand to the United States
Ambassadors of New Zealand to Mexico
Ambassadors of New Zealand to the European Union
New Zealand public servants
University of Canterbury alumni
High Commissioners of New Zealand to the United Kingdom
People from Ashburton, New Zealand
Companions of the New Zealand Order of Merit
People educated at Ashburton College
People educated at Christchurch Boys' High School